Teratodes, commonly known as hooded grasshoppers, is a genus of grasshopper native to India and Sri Lanka.  It was established by the French entomologist Gaspard Auguste Brullé in 1835.

The type species is Teratodes monticollis, which was described by the English zoologist George Robert Gray in 1832 as Gryllus monticollis.

Hooded grasshoppers feed on tree leaves, and they can become serious pests of teak and sandalwood. Both the nymphs and adults of the species are dull green in color. The pronotum expands into a large sharp "hood" structure edged with yellow-orange, giving them the general appearance of a leaf.

Species
Three species are listed in the Orthoptera Species File:
 Teratodes foliatus (Herbst, 1803) [temporary name]
 Teratodes brachypterus Carl, 1916
 Teratodes monticollis (Gray, 1832)

Gallery

References

Acrididae
Insects described in 1835
Taxa named by Gaspard Auguste Brullé